FTU may refer to:

Education 
 Fatoni University, in Thailand
 Florida Technological University, now the University of Central Florida
 Foreign Trade University (Vietnam)
 Frederick Taylor University, in California, United States
Frequent Traveler University, an annual convention and training symposium for users of travel vendors' loyalty programs

Other uses 
 Ultimate tensile strength
 Family Tracing Unit (Sri Lanka)
 Federation of Trade Unions (disambiguation)
 Fiji Teachers Union
 Finger tip unit
 First-time user experience
 Formazin Turbidity Unit
 Frascati Tokamak Upgrade
 Free the Universe, a 2013 album by Major Lazer
 Tôlanaro Airport, in Madagascar